Walkeria tuberosa is a species of colonial bryozoan in the order Ctenostomatida. It is native to the Mediterranean Sea, and has spread to the Red Sea and the Indo-Pacific region. 

This species was first described in 1867 by the Austrian zoologist Camill Heller, and was named in honour of the Scottish minister and natural historian John Walker, a professor at the University of Edinburgh. There is some confusion as to whether the original scientific name of the bryozoan was Walkeria tuberosa or Valkeria tuberosa. The genus name Walkeria was in 1994 given to a genus of dinosaurs, in this case being in honour of the British palaeontologist Alick Walker. When it was realised that the name had previously been used and was therefore not available, the dinosaurs were renamed Alwalkeria.

Description
Walkeria tuberosa is a colonial bryozoan and forms small clusters developing from a thread-like stolon that creeps across the substrate. The zooids are vase-shaped and grow in groups direct from the stolon and not from each other. The colony is light beige or pale grey.

Distribution and habitat
Walkeria tuberosa was first described from the Adriatic Sea and is also found in the western, central and eastern Mediterranean, including between Crete and Turkey. It is also sporadically found in the Red Sea and the Indo-Pacific region, including Malaysia and New Zealand. It grows on rocks and other hard substrates as well as on the thallus of algae. When the tufts of zooids grow among a crowded community of other organisms, its presence is very difficult to detect, but where it grows alone, on an otherwise bare surface, it is easier to spot; such a surface might be a thallus of red alga such as Peyssonnelia sp., of a green alga such as Codium sp. or Flabellia sp., or a colonial tunicate such as Aplidium undulatum.

References 

Ctenostomatida
Fauna of the Mediterranean Sea
Animals described in 1867